The Journal of Materials Chemistry was a weekly peer-reviewed scientific journal covering the applications, properties and synthesis of new materials. It was established in 1991 and published by the Royal Society of Chemistry. At the end of 2012 the journal was split into three independent journals: Journal of Materials Chemistry A (energy and sustainability), Journal of Materials Chemistry B (biology and medicine) and Journal of Materials Chemistry C (optical, magnetic and electronic devices). The editor-in-chief was Liz Dunn.

See also 
 List of scientific journals in chemistry
 Soft Matter
 Journal of Materials Chemistry A
 Journal of Materials Chemistry B
 Journal of Materials Chemistry C

References

External links 
 

Chemistry journals
Materials science journals
Royal Society of Chemistry academic journals
Publications established in 1991
English-language journals
Weekly journals
Academic journal series
1991 establishments in the United Kingdom